The Right Opposition is an alliance of Georgia's New Rights (Conservatives) and Industry will save Georgia parties.  It is the only opposition group that received over seven percent of the votes on March 28, 2004, which was the necessary threshold to secure seats in Parliament. During the November 2003 Rose Revolution, they refused to join the opposition rallies, guaranteeing thereby the quorum to be met at the opening session of the Parliament largely believed to have been elected as a result of gross rigging.

After the election, both the Right Opposition and National Movement traded allegations of vote rigging. However, neither of these claims were substantiated by observers from the European Union in their subsequent report on the elections. The coalition initially gained fifteen of the 150 seats that were elected by party list, but the votes in several of these constituencies were annulled after the elections. They also have two single-mandate constituencies, which remain from the otherwise annulled November, 2003 elections.

Both New Rights and Industrialists find their support largely in the private enterprise community and are particularly popular with those employed in the private sector. As a result, for years the two parties fought each other for the same electorate. While the alliance was formed only weeks before the elections, the party leaders have agreed to merge their two groups into one party, forming the center-right alternative to left-of-center National Movement, which currently governs Georgia.  

The Right Opposition is led by David Gamkrelidze of New Rights Party.  The alliance's main political priorities include securing a flat tax system in Georgia; reducing government regulations on business; increasing economic growth and job creation in the private sector; rising defense spending and securing NATO membership no later than 2010; and promoting liberal democratic political institutions.

Conservative parties in Georgia (country)
Political party alliances in Georgia (country)